Edward Small is a Canadian retired ice hockey defenseman who was an All-American for Clarkson.

Career
Small came to Clarkson University in the fall of 1977. In his first two seasons, under the leadership of Jerry York, the team played well but performed rather unspectacularly in the conference postseason. Small put up respectable numbers but was far down the depth chart and not much more than a stable defender. After York left for greener pastures, Clarkson alumnus Bill O'Flaherty began his tenure in 1979 and Small saw an immediate change. He more than tripled his point production from his sophomore to junior year and was named to the all-conference second team. More importantly, the team won its first playoff game in three years.

For his senior season, Small was named team co-captain with Bryan Cleaver and the Golden Knights went on a stellar run. Clarkson finished the season atop the ECAC Hockey standings and placed three players on the All-American team, including Small. Small was named as the ECAC Hockey Player of the Year and led the Golden Knights into the playoffs with a championship in their sights. Clarkson was derailed in the ECAC semifinal by Providence with a 3–4 overtime loss, however, because the NCAA tournament had been expanded to 8 teams that year, Clarkson received an at-large bid and made their first appearance in eleven years. The Golden Knights received the top eastern seed and faced Wisconsin in a two-game, total-goal series. The Badgers took the first game 2–3 and gave Clarkson plenty of opportunities to erase the deficit in game 2. Unfortunately, the Golden Knights couldn't pull away and the two ended with a 6–6 tie that left Clarkson down a goal for the series. 

After graduation, Small continued his playing career with the Nova Scotia Voyageurs. He played two seasons with the Montreal Canadiens' top farm team but never distinguished himself enough to receive a callup and retired as a player in 1983. Small was later named to the 1980 ECAC All-Decade team.

Statistics

Regular season and playoffs

Awards and honors

References

External links

1959 births
Living people
AHCA Division I men's ice hockey All-Americans
Canadian ice hockey defencemen
Clarkson Golden Knights men's ice hockey players
Ice hockey people from Ottawa
Nova Scotia Voyageurs players